Salvia nanchuanensis is an annual or biennial herb that is native to Hubei and Sichuan provinces in China, growing on riverbanks, rocky slopes, and open areas at  elevation.

There are two named varieties. S.  nanchuanensis var. nanchuanensis has leaves that are 1–2 pinnately compound, with terminal leaflets that are ovate to lanceolate. S.  nanchuanensis var. pteridifolia has leaves that are 3–4 pinnately compound, with terminal leaflets or lobules linear.

References

nanchuanensis
Flora of China